Goshen Food is a Brazilian vegetarian and vegan food manufacturer. It was founded in March 2009 and is based in Ibiúna, São Paulo. It uses soya beans as the main ingredient in its products, which range from soy beef to soy pudding, hamburgers, croquettes, sausages and steaks. It also sells tofu.

See also
 List of meat substitutes
List of vegetarian and vegan companies

References

External links
 RECÉM LANÇADA “COTIA SOLIDÁRIA” RECEBE DOAÇÃO DE DUAS TONELADAS DE ALIMENTOS review in Jornal d'aqui digital (In Portuguese)
 Ceia vegana: opções à base de plantas que te farão salivar:  Uma receita mais saborosa que a outra que vão te dar água na boca e fazer sucesso na família (In Portuguese)
 Articlefrom Just Palermo (In Italian)

2009 establishments in Brazil
Companies based in São Paulo (state)
Food product brands
Food and drink companies established in 2009
Vegetarian companies and establishments
Food and drink companies of Brazil
Brazilian brands